South Hampstead railway station is on Loudoun Road in the London Borough of Camden. It is served by London Overground services on the Watford DC line.

The Chiltern Main Line crosses over the east end of the station on a bridge, briefly in open air between tunnelled sections on each side of the cutting.

History
South Hampstead opened in 1879 as "Loudon Road station" and acquired its present name in 1922. Two platforms on the Euston to Watford DC Line remain; those on the slow main lines were largely demolished in the 1960s. During the West Coast Main Line electrification the original LNWR street building was replaced by one in the 1960s "brick lavatory" style and a new station footbridge was constructed. Traces of the removed station canopies and older footbridge can be seen in the brickwork of the retaining walls on both sides of the line.

South Hampstead station was evocatively described by Sir John Betjeman in his First and Last Loves, 1952.

Services

London Overground
4tph to Watford Junction calling at Kilburn High Road, Queens Park, Kensal Green, Willesden Junction, Harlesden, Stonebridge Park, Wembley Central, North Wembley, South Kenton, Kenton, Harrow & Wealdstone, Headstone Lane, Hatch End, Carpenders Park, Bushey and Watford High Street.
4tph to London Euston only.

Connections
London Buses route 31 and night route N28 and N31 serve the station.

References

External links

Railway stations in the London Borough of Camden
DfT Category E stations
Former London and North Western Railway stations
Railway stations in Great Britain opened in 1879
Railway stations in Great Britain closed in 1917
Railway stations in Great Britain opened in 1922
Railway stations served by London Overground